The canton of Issoire is an administrative division of the Puy-de-Dôme department, central France. Its borders were modified at the French canton reorganisation which came into effect in March 2015. Its seat is in Issoire.

Composition

It consists of the following communes:
 
Aulhat-Flat
Brenat
Le Broc
Issoire
Meilhaud
Orbeil
Pardines
Perrier
Saint-Babel
Saint-Yvoine

Councillors

Pictures of the canton

References

Cantons of Puy-de-Dôme